Elections to the Rajasthan Legislative Assembly were held in May 1980, to elect members of the 200 constituencies in Rajasthan, India. The Indian National Congress (I) won a majority of seats as well as the popular vote, and its leader, Jagannath Pahadia was appointed as the Chief Minister of Rajasthan.

After the passing of The Delimitation of Parliamentary and Assembly Constituencies Order, 1976, Rajasthan's Legslative Assembly was assigned 200 constituencies.

Result

Elected Members

See also 
 List of constituencies of the Rajasthan Legislative Assembly
 1980 elections in India

References

Rajasthan
1980
1980